Atocha is a town in the Sud Chichas Province in the Potosí Department in Bolivia. It is the seat of the Atocha Municipality and Atocha Canton. In 2001 it had 2,033 inhabitants.

References

External links 
 Atocha Municipality: population data and map (PDF; 625 kB)

Populated places in Potosí Department